Dipna Patel is an American-Indian actress and model. She was crowned the 2nd Runner Up at the I AM SHE – Miss India 2012. She also won the Femina Style Diva 2012 Season 1. She made her feature film debut in 2015 with Gujjubhai The Great, a comedy drama based on the franchise of Gujjubhai stage-plays by Siddharth Randeria and directed by Ishaan Randeria.

Early life and education 
Patel pursued a degree in fashion and apparel design from NIFT, Gandhinagar.

Career 
Patel started her glamour career in 2011 by winning the Miss Citadel Pune (Yin Yang) title. She also won the title of Femina Style Diva 2012 1st Season and was the second runner up at the I AM SHE – Miss India 2012.

Patel made her debut in movies with the Ishaan Randeria-directed Gujarati film Gujjubhai The Great, the highest grossing Gujarati film at the time. The film is a comedy-drama based on the franchise of Gujjubhai stage plays by Siddharth Randeria. The movie shot for 8 weeks in Mumbai and 15 weeks in Gujarat.

Patel has done photo shoots and advertisements for various brands, including Kohinoor Basmati Rice, PUMA and Killer Jeans. She has even done anchoring for Magna Publications

Patel won the coveted Best Actress Award (Padmarani Paritoshik Shrestha Abhinetri 2018) out of 8 nominations for her performance in the Gujarati play "Santakukdi". The play was a part of the prestigious Chitralekha Natyaspardha held annually and is an adaptation of the Marathi play White Lily Night Rider.

Works

Plays

Films

TV shows 
 Kanho Banyo Common Man (2015)
 Preet Piyu Anne Pannaben (2015)
 Adaalat (2015)
 Shubharambh (2019)

References 

Female models from Gujarat
Gujarati people
Actresses from Gujarat
Indian film actresses
Living people
1987 births